Marc Bendavid (born June 12, 1986) is a Canadian film, television and stage actor.

Early life
Bendavid was born in Toronto, Ontario, Canada, to a Belgian-born mother and a Moroccan-Jewish father. He attended Unionville High School and was subsequently accepted into National Theatre School of Canada, graduating in 2004.

Career 
Bendavid played the role of Barbara Hershey's character's son Dominic Blythe in Anne of Green Gables: A New Beginning. He played the role Romeo in the play Romeo and Juliet. He has also appeared on the television drama Murdoch Mysteries  and in thrillers, Too Late to Say Goodbye and Her Husband's Betrayal. Bendavid has guest starred in several of Canada's top series, including The Listener and Flashpoint, as well as recurring roles in Hard Rock Medical, Bitten, and Degrassi.

Bendavid has appeared onstage including roles in Salvatore Antonio's play In Gabriel's Kitchen at Buddies in Bad Times theatre and Michel Marc Bouchard's "The Madonna Painter" at Toronto's Factory Theatre, and Arthur Miller's "A View from the Bridge".

In 2014, Bendavid was cast in the role of "One" (a.k.a. Jace Corso, a.k.a. Derrick Moss) on the Canadian science fiction television series Dark Matter, which airs on the Space network in Canada (and on Syfy in the U.S.). The series debuted in the summer of 2015. He had a supporting role as Owen Thomas in Hallmark Original Movie Angel of Christmas.

In 2016, Bendavid had a leading role as Phillip in the Hallmark original movie Summer in the City premiering August 13 on Hallmark Channel, opposite Julianna Guill with Marla Sokoloff, Vivica A. Fox and Natasha Henstridge. In 2017, he played the role of Cliff Baskers in the Hallmark original movie A Rose for Christmas opposite Rachel Boston.

In 2022, he had a recurring role in half of the eight-episode first season of Reacher playing Paul Hubble, a banker who is manipulated into helping launder counterfeit money.

Filmography

Films

Television

References

External links

1986 births
Living people
Canadian male film actors
Canadian male television actors
Canadian male stage actors
Canadian people of Belgian descent
Canadian people of Moroccan-Jewish descent
Jewish Canadian male actors
National Theatre School of Canada alumni
Male actors from Toronto
Canadian male web series actors
21st-century Canadian male actors
Canadian Sephardi Jews
Mizrahi Jews